In enzymology, a deacetyl-[citrate-(pro-3S)-lyase] S-acetyltransferase is an enzyme that catalyzes the chemical reaction

S-acetylphosphopantetheine + deacetyl-[citrate-oxaloacetate-lyase((pro-3S)-CH2COO-->acetate)]  phosphopantetheine + [citrate-oxaloacetate-lyase((pro-3S)-CH2COO-->acetate)]

Thus, the two substrates of this enzyme are S-acetylphosphopantetheine and [[deacetyl-[citrate-oxaloacetate-lyase((pro-3S)-CH2COO-->acetate)]]], whereas its two products are phosphopantetheine and [[citrate-oxaloacetate-lyase((pro-3S)-CH2COO-->acetate)]].

This enzyme belongs to the family of transferases, specifically those acyltransferases transferring groups other than aminoacyl groups.  The systematic name of this enzyme class is S-acetylphosphopantetheine:deacetyl-[citrate-oxaloacetate-lyase((pro -3S)-CH2COO-->acetate)] S-acetyltransferase. Other names in common use include S-acetyl phosphopantetheine:deacetyl citrate lyase, S-acetyltransferase, and deacetyl-[citrate-(pro-3S)-lyase] acetyltransferase.

References

 

EC 2.3.1
Enzymes of unknown structure